Adrian Paul "Adie" Moses (born 4 May 1975) is an English former footballer. He made over 300 appearances in the Premier League and the Football League between 1993 and 2008, he notably played for Barnsley having also featured for Huddersfield Town, Crewe Alexandra, Lincoln City, Mansfield Town and Gainsborough Trinity. He also represented England at Under-21 level.

Career
Moses joined Barnsley as a junior in 1993, making over 150 appearances for the club and appearing in the Premiership. He joined Huddersfield Town for a fee in the region of £250,000 in December 2000, where he made 69 league appearances in two-and-a-half seasons. Whilst at the club he scored twice; once against Ebbsfleet in the FA Cup and once against Notts County in the league. He left Huddersfield on a free transfer in July 2003 and joined Crewe Alexandra on a two-year contract. Injuries restricted him to 57 appearances in three seasons and he was released by Crewe at the end of the 2005–06 season. He then moved to Lincoln City and score on his debut against Notts County, but was not a regular in the first team in the 2007–08 season and was released at the end of the season. He joined Conference National club Mansfield Town in July 2008.

Moses was Captain of Mansfield Town. In December 2008, he was appointed Mansfield's caretaker manager, along with fellow player Mark Stallard, who also played for Lincoln City, after the sacking of Billy McEwan.

On 29 May 2009 Moses signed,
for Gainsborough Trinity. On 27 August it was announced he would take over as caretaker manager of the club following the dismissal of manager Steve Charles, and the resignation of former caretaker managers Dave Reeves and Steve Blatherwick, until the appointment of the new manager, who was revealed as Brian Little.

Personal life
On 10 November 2009, Moses retired from professional football due to ongoing injury troubles, and to concentrate on business interests away from the sport. He now works as a financial consultant for Paul Kerr Associates, a company set up by Paul Kerr in 2002 to offer financial advice to professional footballers.

Personal life
In 2008, Moses graduated from Staffordshire University with a degree in Professional Sports Writing and Broadcasting.

Honours
Barnsley
Football League First Division
Runner-up: 1996–97
Play-off finalists: 1999–2000

References

External links

Adie Moses profile at The Forgotten Imp

1975 births
Living people
Footballers from Doncaster
English footballers
England under-21 international footballers
Association football central defenders
Barnsley F.C. players
Huddersfield Town A.F.C. players
Crewe Alexandra F.C. players
Lincoln City F.C. players
Mansfield Town F.C. players
Gainsborough Trinity F.C. players
Premier League players
English Football League players
National League (English football) players
Alumni of Staffordshire University
English football managers
Mansfield Town F.C. managers
Gainsborough Trinity F.C. managers